Willowbrook may refer to:

Institutions
 Willowbrook High School in Villa Park, Illinois
 Willowbrook Museum Village, a museum in Newfield, Maine
 Willowbrook State School, a former state-supported institution for developmentally disabled children in Staten Island, New York

Places
 Willowbrook, California
Willowbrook/Rosa Parks station
 Willowbrook, DuPage County, Illinois
 Willowbrook, Will County, Illinois
 Willowbrook, Kansas
 Willowbrook, Saskatchewan, Canada
 Willowbrook, Staten Island, a neighborhood of Staten Island, New York
 Willowbrook, Houston, Texas, a neighborhood in Texas

Other
 Willowbrook (bus manufacturer), a former vehicle body builder in England
 Willowbrook Rail Maintenance Facility, a GO Transit rail yard and rolling stock maintenance facility in Toronto, Canada
 Piper Willowbrook, main character of Nickelodeon's 2017 show Mysticons

See also
Willow Brook (disambiguation)